The Lincoln Highwayman is a 1919 American silent mystery film directed by Emmett J. Flynn, and starring William Russell, Lois Lee, Frank Brownlee, Jack Connolly, and Edward Peil Sr. The film was released by Fox Film Corporation on December 28, 1919.

Plot

Cast
William Russell as Jimmy Clunder
Lois Lee as Marian Calvert
Frank Brownlee as Captain Claver
Jack Connolly as Mack
Edward Peil Sr. as Steele
Harry Spingler as Danny Murphy
Edwin B. Tilton as The Governor

Preservation
The film is now considered lost.

References

External links

1919 mystery films
Fox Film films
American mystery films
1919 films
American silent feature films
American black-and-white films
Lost American films
1919 lost films
Lost mystery films
1910s American films
Silent mystery films